The Power Macintosh 7300 (also sold with server software as the Apple Workgroup Server 7350) is a personal computer designed, manufactured and sold by Apple Computer from February 1997 to November 1997. It was introduced with 166, 180 and 200 MHz CPUs in February 1997 alongside the Power Macintosh 8600 and 9600. 
The 7300 replaced both the Power Macintosh 7200 and 7600, replacing the only remaining first-generation PowerPC system in Apple's lineup. MacUser Magazine's review says the 7300 "offers the most satisfying improvement" of the new machines introduced in early 1997 due to a significant performance jump from its predecessors, as well as offering 50% faster CD-ROM and hard disk space.
The 7300 was replaced by the Power Macintosh G3 desktop model in November 1997. Workgroup Server 7350 continued to be sold until March 1998 when the Macintosh Server G3 was introduced.

Hardware 
The 7300 uses the "Outrigger" case first introduced with the Power Macintosh 7500, but features an enhanced PowerPC 604e CPU. However, it no longer came with the video in capability the 7600 had, which possibly accounts for the fact that this is the only time that Apple used a lower model number for an upgraded model. Apart from that, the 7300 is more closely related to the 7600 than to the 7200, with features such as a processor daughtercard and interleaved RAM. The 7300/180 model was also available in a "PC compatible" configuration that included a 166 MHz Pentium processor with its own RAM (up to 64 MiB) on a PCI card which also provides a PC game port.  This allowed the Mac to dual-boot Microsoft Windows, which was not compatible with PowerPC hardware.  The PC Compatible Macs were effectively two computers combined in to one.

Like the Power Macintosh 7600, the 7300 series utilizes 168 pin DRAM DIMMS, allowing for a total of 8 to be added for 1024 MiB in total.  It utilized VRAM SIMMS and allowed 4 units to be added for a total of 4 MiB, providing output at a resolution of up to 1152x870 at 24-bit and 1280x1024 at 16-bit. Additionally, it includes 3 PCI slots allowing the addition of third party cards, including graphics cards.

A 2 GB SCSI hard drive was included as standard, on an internal 10 MiB/s SCSI bus, with an external 5 MiB/s SCSI port on the back panel.

Models 
Introduced February 13, 1997:
 Power Macintosh 7300/166: Sold in Europe and Asia.

Introduced February 17, 1997:
 Power Macintosh 7300/180
 Power Macintosh 7300/200

Introduced April 4, 1997:
 Power Macintosh 7300/180 PC Compatible

Introduced April 21, 1997:
 Workgroup Server 7350/180

Timeline

References

External links 

 Power Macintosh 7300 at apple-history.com
 Power Macintosh 7300/166, 7300/180 and 7300/200 at EveryMac.com

7300
7300
Macintosh desktops
Computer-related introductions in 1997